Kelly is the sixth studio album by American R&B singer-songwriter Kelly Price. It was released by My Block Records and Malaco Records on May 3, 2011. The album was preceded by the release of three singles, "Tired", "Not My Daddy" (featuring Stokley Williams) and "Himaholic".

Promotion
"Tired" was released to iTunes as the lead single on August 17, 2010. On September 4, 2010 "Tired" debuted at number 29 on the Billboard Adult R&B Songs chart. The following week the song peaked at 26 on September 4, 2010
and spent 3 weeks on the chart. On September 18, 2010 the song debuted at number 87 on the Hot R&B/Hip-Hop Songs chart. The following week the song peaked at number 82 on September 25, 2011 and spent 6 weeks on the chart.

"Not My Daddy"  was released to iTunes as the second single on March 8, 2011. 
 On May 21, 2011 "Not My Daddy" debuted at number 6 on the Billboard Adult R&B Songs chart and spent 21 weeks on the chart. On May 21, 2011 the song debuted at number 85 on Billboard Radio Songs chart. On June 11, 2011 the song debuted at number 29 on the R&B/Hip-Hop Airplay chart. The following week the song peaked at number 22 on June 18, 2011 and spent 18 weeks on the chart.

"Himaholic" was released as the album's third and final single in August 2011. On August 20, 2011 the song debuted at number 69 on the R&B/Hip-Hop Airplay chart. The song debuted at number 91 on Hot R&B/Hip-Hop Songs chart. The following week the song peaked at number 69 on August 20, 2011 and spent 4 weeks on the chart. The song debuted at number 24 on the Billboard Adult R&B Songs chart on September 3, 2011. The following week the song peaked at number 21 on September 10, 2011 and spent 9 weeks on the chart.

Critical reception

Andy Kellman from AllMusic rated Kelly three and a half stars out of five and wrote: "Price collaborates extensively with Campbell (Mary Mary, Alicia Keys, Brandy), who comes up with some of his biggest-sounding productions in order to match her voice. The cathartic, closet-cleaning “Tired" and the following song, a club throwback based around War's "Galaxy" (with a touch of Michael Jackson's "Don't Stop 'Til You Get Enough)", are highlights, as is the relaxed "Speechless"—adroit synth-funk that recalls the early-‘80s productions of Leon Sylvers III and Prince. A handful of other producers, such as longtime Price associate Shep Crawford, contribute in smaller capacities [...] and the result sounds just like classic Mint Condition — a vibrant, almost live-sounding song filled with hooks that deserves to be one of the bigger adult R&B singles of 2011."

Accolades
"Not My Daddy" was nominated for two Grammy Awards at the 54th Annual Grammy Awards for Best R&B Song and Best R&B Performance. The album also got a Grammy nomination for Best R&B Album in 2012.

Commercial performance
The album debuted at number 36 on the US Billboard 200, number 9 on the US Top R&B/Hip-Hop Albums chart and number 7 on the US Independent Albums chart on May 21, 2011.

Track listing

Charts

Weekly charts

Year-end charts

Release history

References

2011 albums
Kelly Price albums